Unpretty Rapstar 3 is a 2016 South Korean music competition program focusing on female rappers. It is the third season of Unpretty Rapstar, which premiered in January 2015 on Mnet as a spin-off of Show Me the Money. The show was hosted by rapper and producer YDG, and the winner of it was Giant Pink.

Contestants

Winner: Giant Pink (SMTM5 contestant) 
First runner-up: Nada (former Wa$$up member, SMTM3 contestant)

Semifinalists:
Jeon So-yeon of Cube Entertainment (Produce 101 trainee during that time and now (G)I-DLE leader)
Ash-B  (Unpretty Rapstar 2 Contestant, SMTM5 contestant) 
Quarter Finalists:
 Miryo of Brown Eyed Girls, (SMTM producer) (Eliminated in episode 9)
 Yuk Ji-dam (Unpretty Rapstar 1 contestant, SMTM3 contestant) (Eliminated in episode 9)

Eliminated Contestants:
 Euna Kim (former The Ark member, Superstar K3 contestant, The Unit contestant, KHAN member) (Eliminated in episode 8)
 Grazy Grace (YouTube vlogger and soloist) (Eliminated in episode 8) 
 Ha Jooyeon (former Jewelry member, SMTM5 contestant) (Eliminated in episode 6)
 Janey (former GP Basic member, SMTM5 contestant, The Unit contestant) (Eliminated in episode 6) 
 Kool Kid (K-pop Star 4 contestant) (Joined in episode 3, eliminated in episode 5)
Kassy (Eliminated in episode 3)

Additional Match Contestants:
 Ki Hui-hyeon of DIA, (Produce 101 contestant)
 Tilda (SMTM5 contestant)
 Ra$on (SMTM6 contestant)
 Lola Roze

Discography

References

External links
 Unpretty Rapstar 3

3
2016 South Korean television series debuts
2016 South Korean television series endings
Korean-language television shows
Mnet (TV channel) original programming
Hip hop television